Samland District (Landkreis Samland), was a district in Königsberg Region, East Prussia.

Königsberg
Districts of East Prussia